It Won't Be the Last is the second studio album by American country music artist Billy Ray Cyrus. Certified Platinum in just under a year after release by the RIAA, the album has sold over 1 million copies in the US and over 3 million copies worldwide. This album produced four singles for Cyrus on the Hot Country Songs charts: "In the Heart of a Woman", "Somebody New", "Words by Heart" and "Talk Some", which reached number #3, number #9, number #12, and number #63, respectively, on the charts. The first, third and fourth singles, plus two album tracks ("Ain't Your Dog No More" and "When I'm Gone") had accompanying music videos. "Somebody New" was covered in 2008 by Jill King, whose version was released as a single, however, it did not chart.

Track listing

Personnel
Adapted credits from the media notes of It Won't Be the Last.

Sly Dog
 Billy Ray Cyrus – lead vocals, rhythm guitar
 Greg Fletcher – drums, percussion, backing vocals
 Corky Holbrook – bass guitar, backing vocals
 Michael J. Sagraves – acoustic guitar, electric guitar, pedal steel guitar, harmonica, backing vocals
 Terry Shelton – lead guitar, backing vocals
 Barton Stevens – keyboards, backing vocals

Additional Musicians
 Mike Brignardello – bass guitar
 Clyde Carr – backing vocals
 Costo Davis – keyboards
 Sonny Garrish – steel guitar
 Keith D. Hinton – acoustic and electric guitars
 Roy Huskey, Jr. – upright bass
 Mike Lawler – keyboards
 Neal Matthews – backing vocals
 Joe Scaife – backing vocals
 Gordon Stoker – backing vocals
 Don Von Tress – acoustic, electric and bass guitars, backing vocals
 Ray C. Walker – backing vocals
 Duane West – backing vocals

Production
 Joe Scaife – co-producer, mixing
 Jim Cotton – co-producer, mixing
 Grahame Smith – assistant engineer
 Clyde Carr – assistant engineer
 Todd Culross – assistant engineer
 Hank Williams – mastering 
 Ronnie Thomas – digital editing

Artwork
 Kim Markovchick – executive art direction
 Virginia Team – art direction
 Jerry Joyner – design
 Peter Nash – photography

Charts

Weekly charts

Year-end charts

Singles

Certifications

References

1993 albums
Billy Ray Cyrus albums
Mercury Nashville albums